Lactuca muralis, the wall lettuce, is a perennial flowering plant in the  tribe Cichorieae within the family Asteraceae, also referred to as Mycelis muralis.

Its chief characteristic is its open airy clumps of yellow flowers. There are no disc flowers.

Description

It often has purplish stems, and exudes a milky juice.

The lower leaves are lyre shaped, pinnate shaped.  The lobes are triangular in shape, the terminal lobe being the largest.  The upper leaves are stalkless, smaller and less lobed.  All leaves are red tinged.

The achenes are short beaked, spindle shaped and black.  The pappus has simple white hairs, the inner longer than the outer.

The flower heads are yellow, small with only 4–5 yellow ray florets.  wide more or less, on branches 90 degrees to the main stem, in loose panicle.   It flowers from June until September.

Lactuca muralis is similar to Lactuca serriola L. and Lactuca virosa L. but clearly distinguished by having only 5 florets.

Taxonomy
The specific Latin epithet muralis is interpreted as 'growing on walls'.

Distribution and ecology
Lactuca muralis is a native of Europe but has invaded shady roadsides, paths and logged areas of the Pacific Northwest and New England  It has become naturalized in parts of Northern Ireland as long ago as 1913. It was first recorded in The Burren, where it is now frequent, in 1939.

It can be found in woodlands, especially Beech.  It is also found in calcareous soils, and walls.

References

muralis
Flora of Europe
Plants described in 1753
Taxa named by Carl Linnaeus